Israel Sánchez (6 July 1929 – 13 October 2005) was a Cuban wrestler. He competed in the men's freestyle lightweight at the 1948 Summer Olympics.

References

External links
 

1929 births
2005 deaths
Cuban male sport wrestlers
Olympic wrestlers of Cuba
Wrestlers at the 1948 Summer Olympics
Place of birth missing